Schenley High School, located in the North Oakland neighborhood at the edge of the Hill District in Pittsburgh, Pennsylvania, is a historic building opened in 1916 that was a part of the Pittsburgh Public Schools. The Schenley High School building was closed in June 2008 in a 5-4 vote by the school district due to issues with asbestos. Its staff and students were relocated the following year. The Schenley name was retired and its last class graduated in 2011. On February 28, 2013 the Pittsburgh School Board approved the sale of Schenley High School to the PMC Property Group of Philadelphia in a 5-4 vote. 

The Schenley building is listed on the National Register of Historic Places (NRHP Reference #86002706). and the Pittsburgh History and Landmarks Foundation Register. It is also a contributing property in the Schenley Farms Historic District.

History
Schenley High School was named for Pittsburgh philanthropist Mary Schenley, on whose land the school was built. It was designed by Edward Stotz as a triangle with rounded corners and constructed of Indiana limestone, the best of its kind. Schenley was the first high school in the United States to cost more than one million dollars to build. When Schenley opened in 1916, there were 1800 students and 70 teachers. Through public donation a Skinner Pipe Organ was donated to the school, the organ remained in the auditorium until the closing of the school. The school published "The Triangle," a monthly student newspaper founded in 1919 and named for the building's original shape. The school's highest enrollment was 3012 in March 1940. Schenley sports teams won many city and state championships, including several state basketball titles in the 1970s. In 1983, the school was rededicated as the Schenley High School Teacher Center, an innovative program in which all of the district's teachers would cycle through Schenley to update methods. The program would be deemed successful enough to warrant a visit from then United States Secretary of Education William Bennet. In 1987, a new wing was added to the building.

Relocation and Closure
In June 2008, due to severe maintenance problems, school district Superintendent Mark Roosevelt proposed to close Schenley High School to avoid an extremely high renovation bill. This led to public opposition by students and historical organizations that felt the building was worth saving. After months of debate the school board voted 5-4 to close the school following the 2007-2008 school year. The staff and students were moved to the Reizenstein Middle School building, which had been closed a few years earlier. Freshmen, sophomores and juniors who were enrolled in Schenley at the time of its closure were allowed to graduate as Schenley students. Schenley's final class graduated on June 12, 2011. For future classes, Schenley was renamed to Obama Academy, and the Reizenstein building became a shared space for the two Schools from 2009-2011.  Obama Academy, which found a permanent home in the former Peabody high school building beginning in the 2012-2013 school year, preserved much of Schenley's teaching staff throughout the transition, as well as the IB academic curriculum and award-winning musical theater program.  Protests to save the original Schenley High building ultimately failed on February 27, 2013 when the  Pittsburgh Public Schools board voted to 5-4 to sell the building to a developer who would convert the former school into luxury apartments.

Me and Earl and the Dying Girl
The Summer of 2014 saw the Schenley High School building play a starring role in the film Me and Earl and the Dying Girl. The film, based on the 2013 book written by Schenley graduate Jesse Andrews, tells the tale of a Schenley senior who is dealing with coming of age while facing the possibility of losing a sick classmate. For the movie scenes were filmed throughout Schenley High School, including the auditorium and cafeteria. The school colors in the film, however, were changed from red and black to blue and gold. The film premiered at the 2015 Sundance Film Festival, where it broke records. Distributor Fox Searchlight purchased the rights to the film for an estimated 12 million dollars.

https://essaysonline.org/

Notable alumni

William Albertson American Communist politician framed by the FBI
Jesse Andrews – novelist and screenwriter known for Me and Earl and the Dying Girl
Derrick Bell – Harvard Law School's first African American professor
George Benson – Jazz/R&B musician and recording artist
DeJuan Blair – Washington Wizards NBA player
Larry Brown – Washington Redskins player
Ray Brown – jazz musician
Billy Cox – bassist who played with Jimi Hendrix
Frank Curto – chief horticulturist, Pittsburgh Dept. of Parks and Recreation 
Darnell Dinkins – NFL player
Ken Durrett – NBA player
Walt Harper – jazz musician
Philip Hershkovitz - mammalogist
Art Hyatt – NBL pro basketball player
 DeAndre Kane - basketball player in the Israeli Premier League and EuroLeague
D. J. Kennedy – NBA player
Maurice Lucas – NBA player for 1977 champion Portland Trail Blazers
Robert Mosley – opera singer
Bill Nunn – actor
Bob Prince – Pittsburgh Pirates play-by-play announcer
Bruno Sammartino – Professional wrestler
Raymond Saunders – Painter, Professor Emeritus
Clifford Shull – Nobel laureate
Ted Stepien – Cleveland Cavaliers owner from 1980–83
Benjamin Tatar – actor
Stanley Turrentine – jazz musician
Andy Warhol – iconic artist

References

External links

Schenley High School website
Pittsburgh Public Schools
Historic, asbestos-plagued Schenley deserves reprieve and makeover from Pittsburgh Post-Gazette, February 22, 2006

School buildings on the National Register of Historic Places in Pennsylvania
Educational institutions established in 1916
International Baccalaureate schools in Pennsylvania
High schools in Pittsburgh
Pittsburgh History & Landmarks Foundation Historic Landmarks
Defunct schools in Pennsylvania
1916 establishments in Pennsylvania
National Register of Historic Places in Pittsburgh
Individually listed contributing properties to historic districts on the National Register in Pennsylvania